Nathan Parker may refer to:
 Nathan Parker (American football), American football player
 Nathan Parker (writer), English screenwriter

See also
 Nate Parker, American actor and filmmaker
 Nathaniel Parker, English stage and screen actor